Vormstad is a village in the municipality of Orkland in Trøndelag county, Norway. The village is located along the Orkla River between the villages of Svorkmo and Fannrem. The  village of Vormstad has a population (2009) of 291.

Vormstad is a centre for salmon fishing in the Orkla River, and the population increases many times through the fishing season in June, July, and August.

The name of the village comes from the river Vorma which flows into the Orkla River at Vormstad. The village was the municipal center of the old municipality of Orkland. Moe Church is located just south of Vormstad.

References

Villages in Trøndelag
Orkland